Tralonide (brand name Talidan) is a synthetic glucocorticoid corticosteroid.

References

Acetonides
Chloroarenes
Corticosteroid cyclic ketals
Diketones
Fluoroarenes
Glucocorticoids
Pregnanes